Polyerata is a genus of hummingbirds.

Species
The genus contains three species:
Blue-chested hummingbird, Polyerata amabilis
Charming hummingbird, Polyerata decora
Purple-chested hummingbird, Polyerata rosenbergi

These species were formerly placed in the genus Amazilia. A molecular phylogenetic study published in 2014 found that Amazilia was polyphyletic. In the revised classification to create monophyletic genera, these three species were moved to the resurrected genus Polyerata that had been introduced in 1863 by the German ornithologist Ferdinand Heine to accommodate the blue-chested hummingbird which therefore becomes the type species. The genus name is from Ancient Greek poluēratos meaning "very lovely".

References

Polyerata 
Bird genera